Ruth Ford may refer to:

Ruth Ford (1911–2009), American model and actress
Ruth VanSickle Ford (1897–1989), American painter and art teacher
Ruth Atkinson Ford (1918–1997), American cartoonist